The 1931 Michigan State Spartans football team represented Michigan State College as an independent during the 1931 college football season. In their third season under head coach Jim Crowley, the Spartans compiled a 5–3–1 record and played to a scoreless tie in their annual rivalry game with Michigan. In inter-sectional play, the team defeated Georgetown (6-0) and lost to Army (20-7) and Syracuse (15-7). In one of the most one-sided games in Michigan State history, the Spartans also defeated Ripon College on November 7, 1931, by a 100 to 0 score.

Quarterback Bob Monnett was selected by the Central Press Association as a first-team player on the 1931 College Football All-America Team.

Schedule

Game summaries

Michigan

On November 14, 1931, the Spartans played the Michigan Wolverines to a scoreless tie at Michigan Stadium.

References

Michigan State
Michigan State Spartans football seasons
Michigan State Spartans football